Aleksey Mochalov (born 13 February 1990) is a Uzbekistani canoeist. He competed in the men's K-1 1000 metres event at the 2016 Summer Olympics.

References

External links
 
 
 

1990 births
Living people
Uzbekistani male canoeists
Olympic canoeists of Uzbekistan
Canoeists at the 2016 Summer Olympics
Place of birth missing (living people)
Asian Games gold medalists for Uzbekistan
Asian Games bronze medalists for Uzbekistan
Asian Games medalists in canoeing
Canoeists at the 2010 Asian Games
Canoeists at the 2014 Asian Games
Canoeists at the 2018 Asian Games
Medalists at the 2010 Asian Games
Medalists at the 2014 Asian Games
21st-century Uzbekistani people